is a Japanese singer-songwriter, actor, and model associated with Avex Entertainment. He debuted as a member of the co-ed group AAA in 2005. Early on in his career, Atae starred in television and film projects including the live-action adaptations of Psychic Detective Yakumo, Delicious Gakuin, Teiō, Guardian Angel, and Ramune.

In 2016, Atae released music solo, beginning with the song "Reunited", and later released his first solo album, This is Who I Am, as a limited release in 2018. He is also an exclusive model in the magazines Junon and Duet.

Career

2005-2015: AAA and early acting career

Atae was accepted into Avex when he was 14 years old and debuted as a member of the co-ed group AAA in September 2005. In 2006, he also began making acting appearances on television, with his debut role in Karera no Umi VIII: Sentimental Journey, which starred other AAA members. In the same year, he starred in the live-action television drama adaptation of Psychic Detective Yakumo, and in 2007, he co-starred in Delicious Gakuin.

In 2009, Atae co-starred in the film Guardian Angel and also played lead in the television drama Teiō. In 2010, he starred in the film Ramune and also recorded the theme song, "Kimi ga Ireba", as a featured artist with Hiroki Maekawa, which was later released as a digital single. On December 15, 2010, he released his first photo book, Shinking.

Atae was a featured artist on Maekawa's song, "Kimi ga Daisuki de", which was released on March 7, 2012. On March 30, 2013, he released his photo book, Atae Best. He was featured in a dating sim visual novel game titled AAA Shinjiro Atae Love Trip, which was released on October 24, 2014.

2016-present: Solo music career

Atae took a brief hiatus in the spring of 2016 to study at a university in Los Angeles, California. On May 14, 2016, he released a photo book, Just the Beginning, which was shot during his studies abroad. On June 20, 2016, due to fan demand, Atae released the song "Reunited" as a digital single, which was originally released on the DVD bundled with Just the Beginning. The song is described as a love song written in English. "Reunited" peaked at #1 on iTunes in Japan.

On July 19, 2017, Atae released "Goody-Good Girl" as a digital single. Later in the year, he released "Can't Stop" and performed both songs at the Girls Award 2017 Spring/Summer and the 2017 Tokyo Girls Collection fashion shows. In August 2017, he started his own fashion brand, I Am What I Am. On November 2, 2017, he released his travel book, Shinjiro's Travel Book, which documented his experiences while studying abroad in Los Angeles in 2016.

In May 2018, Atae announced he was releasing his album, This is Who I Am, on November 26, 2018 to celebrate his 30th birthday. On June 18, 2018, he pre-released "Gold Mine" as a digital single. Up until the release of the album, he also pre-released the music videos for "Baby", "Love Sugar", and "You Only Live Once."

In May 2019, Atae held his first solo concert on a 6-day tour. In September 2019, he collaborated with Thelma Aoyama to compose and write the song "Suki Suki Suki." In November 2019, he was announced as the image model of the jewelry brand Empathy All People. For his 31st birthday, on November 26, 2019, he released the song "Follow Me" as the theme song used in the commercials for haircare brand Nalow, which he also appeared in.

In November 2020, Atae announced through his official website and social media that he was putting his entertainment career on hold following AAA's hiatus in 2021.

Personal life

Aside from speaking Japanese, Atae is also fluent in English, having learned English as a hobby and being a student at ECC since he was in elementary school. In 2015, he collaborated with ECC to release a series of English conversation videos and led an English conversation class for 20 students.

Discography

Studio albums

Singles

As lead artist

As featured artist

Filmography

Television

Films

Solo DVDs

Publications

Photo books

Photo essays

Notes

References

External links
 

21st-century Japanese male actors
1988 births
AAA (band) members
Actors from Kyoto Prefecture
Japanese male pop singers
Living people
Musicians from Kyoto Prefecture